AVML may refer to:
Alan Villiers Memorial Lecture, a lecture series on naval history
Alta Via dei Monti Liguri, a hiking trail in Liguria, Italy
International Air Transport Association code for Asian Vegetarian Meal